Eric Leman (born 17 July 1946) is a former professional road racing cyclist from West Flanders, Belgium. He won the prestigious Tour of Flanders three times.

Major results

1968
1st, Kuurne–Brussels–Kuurne
1st, Porto–Lisboa
1st, Stage 2, Four Days of Dunkirk
1st, Stage 21, Tour de France
1969
1st, Dwars door Vlaanderen
1st, Stage 3, Paris–Nice
1st, Stages 1, 2, 5 and 7, Vuelta a Andalucía
1st, Stage 3, Tour de France
1970
1st, GP Briek Schotte
1st, Tour of Flanders
1st, Stage 4, Paris–Nice
1st, Stage 1 and 3b, Vuelta a Andalucía
1st, Prologue, Tour of Belgium
1971
1st, Gullegem Koerse
1st, Kampioenschap van Vlaanderen
1st, Omloop der Vlaamse Ardennen
1st, Omloop Mandel-Leie-Schelde
1st, Stage 1a and 5a, Critérium du Dauphiné Libéré
1st, Stages 1, 2a and 4, Paris–Nice
1st, Prologue B and Stage 2, Vuelta a Andalucía
1st, Stage 1a, 6a and 7, Tour de France
1972
1st, Tour of Flanders
1st, Stage 4, Four Days of Dunkirk
1st, Stages 1 and 3, Paris–Nice
1st, Stage 2, Tour of Belgium
1973
1st, Tour of Flanders
1st, Stage 2b, Paris–Nice
1974
1st, Stage 4, Paris–Nice
1st, Stage 2, Vuelta a España
1975
1st, Stage 1, Paris–Nice
1976
1st, Omloop van Midden-Vlaanderen
1977
1st, Stage 4, Vuelta a Aragón

References

External links

Palmarès by memoire-du-cyclisme.net 

Living people
Belgian male cyclists
Belgian Tour de France stage winners
Belgian Vuelta a España stage winners
1946 births
People from Ledegem
Cyclists from West Flanders
20th-century Belgian people